The Flag of Rio Grande do Norte, a state of Brazil, was designed by Luís da Câmara Cascudo. It is a horizontal bicolor of green and white with a ratio of 2:3. In the center it is charged with the coat of arms of Rio Grande do Norte.  The arms features the basic elements that best represents Rio Grande do Norte: the coconut tree on the left, the Copernicia prunifera on the right, the sugarcane and the cotton, represents the flora. The sea with the jangada stands for the fishing and the salt extraction.

The flag was adopted 3 December 1957.

References
Flags of the World

Flag of Rio Grande do Norte
Rio Grande do Norte
Flags introduced in 1957
1957 establishments in Brazil